Gümüşkaş is a village in the Baykan District of Siirt Province in Turkey. The village is populated by Kurds of the Çirî tribe and had a population of 307 in 2021.

References 

Kurdish settlements in Siirt Province
Villages in Baykan District